The 2016 Tennessee Tech Golden Eagles football team represented Tennessee Technological University as a member of Ohio Valley Conference (OVC) during the 2016 NCAA Division I FCS football season. Led by first-year head coach Marcus Satterfield, the Golden Eagles compiled an overall record of 5–6 overall with a mark of 5–3 in conference play, placing third in the OVC. Tennessee Tech played home games at Tucker Stadium in Cookeville, Tennessee.

Schedule

Game summaries

Wofford

at Austin Peay

at Mercer

at UT Martin

Eastern Kentucky

at Jacksonville State

Eastern Illinois

Southeast Missouri State

at Tennessee

at Tennessee State

Murray State

References

Tennessee Tech
Tennessee Tech Golden Eagles football seasons
Tennessee Tech Golden Eagles football